Laura Elizabeth Dern (born February 10, 1967) is an American actress. She is the recipient of numerous accolades, including an Academy Award, a Primetime Emmy Award, a BAFTA Award, and five Golden Globe Awards.

Born to actor Bruce Dern and actress Diane Ladd, Dern embarked on an acting career in the 1980s and rose to prominence for her performances in Mask (1985) and the David Lynch films Blue Velvet (1986) and Wild at Heart (1990). She received her first Academy Award nomination for her portrayal of the titular orphan in the drama film Rambling Rose (1991), and achieved international recognition for her role as Ellie Sattler in Steven Spielberg's adventure film Jurassic Park (1993), a role that she reprised in the sequels Jurassic Park III (2001) and Jurassic World Dominion (2022).

After winning two Golden Globe Awards for her performances as Katherine Harris in the television film Recount (2008), and Amy Jellicoe in the comedy-drama series Enlightened (2011–2013), Dern garnered her second Academy Award nomination for her work in the biopic Wild (2014). In 2017, she began starring as Renata Klein in the drama series Big Little Lies, winning a Primetime Emmy Award and a Golden Globe Award, and reunited with David Lynch for Twin Peaks: The Return. She has played supporting roles in the films Star Wars: The Last Jedi (2017), Marriage Story (2019), and Little Women (2019). Her performance in Marriage Story won her numerous accolades including an Academy Award and her fifth Golden Globe Award for Best Supporting Actress.

Early life
Laura Elizabeth Dern was born on February 10, 1967, in Los Angeles, California. The daughter of actors Diane Ladd and Bruce Dern and great-granddaughter of former Utah governor and Secretary of War George Dern, she was conceived while her parents were filming The Wild Angels. Poet, writer, and Librarian of Congress Archibald MacLeish was her great-great-uncle. After her parents divorced when she was two years old, Dern was largely brought up by her mother and maternal grandmother, Mary, who had Norwegian ancestry, from Oslo. She was raised Catholic. Her godmother was actress Shelley Winters. She developed scoliosis as a child.

Her first film foray was an appearance as an extra in White Lightning (1973), a film in which her mother starred. Her official film debut was an appearance in Alice Doesn't Live Here Anymore (1974), opposite her mother. In 1982, Dern served as Miss Golden Globe at 15 years old. In the same year, she portrayed a rebellious rock band member in the cult film Ladies and Gentlemen, The Fabulous Stains. At 16, after doubling on her classes to graduate high school a semester early, she sought and attained emancipation, which allowed her to work the same amount of hours as an adult on films. After moving out of her home at the age of 17, Dern became roommates with Marianne Williamson, and enrolled at UCLA intending to double major in psychology and journalism, but withdrew two days into the semester to film Blue Velvet.

Career

1980–1999: Career beginnings and breakthrough
Dern got her first credited role, Debbie, appearing alongside Jodie Foster in the 1980 coming-of-age film Foxes. At the age of 11, she had originally auditioned for a different role after telling casting directors that she was 14. In 1985, she was cast two weeks before production began as the protagonist, a carefree 15-year-old girl, Connie Wyatt, who grabs the attention of a predatory stranger, in the film Smooth Talk. The film won the Grand Jury Prize at the Sundance Film Festival in the Dramatic category in 1986 and received largely favorable reviews. It is seen as the film that launched Dern's career.

Between 1985 and 1990, Dern gained critical acclaim for her performances in Mask, Blue Velvet, and Wild at Heart–the latter two of which were directed by David Lynch–which began a longstanding collaboration between Dern and Lynch. In the biographical drama film, Mask, she played the role of Diana Adams, a blind girl who becomes Rocky Dennis' love interest, starring alongside Eric Stoltz and Cher. At the age of 16, Dern was cast as Sandy Williams, one of the starring roles alongside Kyle MacLachlan and Isabella Rossellini in the critically successful mystery thriller film Blue Velvet. It is widely regarded as Dern's breakthrough performance.

In 1990, Dern once again collaborated with Lynch, starring as Lula Fortune alongside Nicolas Cage in the black comedy crime film Wild At Heart, where she portrays a vastly different character from her previous role in Blue Velvet. Dern called the role an opportunity 'to play not only a very sexual person, but also someone who was, in her own way, incredibly comfortable with herself'. The film, which had won the Palme d'Or at the Cannes Film Festival, was met with generally positive reviews from critics but polarized some audiences at the time. Lynch cast Dern's mother, Diane Ladd, to play Lula's overbearing mother in the film.

Dern auditioned for the role of Clarice Starling in The Silence of the Lambs (1991), but lost the role due to studio's skepticism about her level of fame at the time. In 1992, Dern and her mother, Diane Ladd, became the first mother and daughter to be nominated for Academy Awards for acting in the same film for their performances in Rambling Rose–Ladd received a Best Supporting Actress nomination, while Dern received one for Best Actress. The following year, she won a Golden Globe Award for Best Actress – Miniseries or Television Film and received her first Primetime Emmy Award nomination for Outstanding Lead Actress in a Limited Series or Television Movie for her performance in the 1992 television film Afterburn.

Dern starred as Dr. Ellie Sattler in Steven Spielberg's 1993 film Jurassic Park, achieving international recognition with the role. Dern, who had been more focused on independent films prior to the film, was Spielberg’s first choice for the role of Ellie Sattler after having been impressed with her work in Smooth Talk and Rambling Rose. She was influenced by Wild At Heart costar Nicolas Cage to take the role and called the decision an "easy yes", recalling how Spielberg and producer Kathleen Kennedy made sure the character was a "no-nonsense feminist who had her own independent spirit and was brilliant in her craft" and wasn't an "oversexualized action heroine" while describing filming to be similar to an independent film.

That same year, Clint Eastwood contacted the actress for his film A Perfect World. After the release of Jurassic Park, Dern was offered many roles in blockbuster films and ultimately chose to star in Alexander Payne's directorial debut black comedy film Citizen Ruth to avoid typecasting as the character Ruth Stoops, a pregnant drug addict who unexpectedly attracts national attention from those involved in the abortion debate. The film debuted at Sundance Film Festival to critical acclaim for the film and for Dern's performance but only received a limited release from Miramax likely due to its controversial topic. Ladd made a cameo appearance, playing Dern's character's mother for the third time following Rambling Rose and Wild At Heart, with Dern's character screaming a torrent of abuse at her.

In 1997, Dern was asked by Ellen DeGeneres to guest star as Susan Richmond, a lesbian who helps Degeneres' character, Ellen Morgan, come out of the closet in "The Puppy Episode" of the sitcom Ellen, while DeGeneres herself came out at the same time offscreen. Despite protests from people around her, she shrugged off concerns and immediately accepted the role where she received her third Primetime Emmy Award nomination for Outstanding Guest Actress In A Comedy Series. The decision significantly impacted her career in the following years with Dern revealing in an April 2007 airing of The Ellen DeGeneres Show that she did not work for more than a year and that she needed a "full security detail" following her appearance in the historic episode due to the resulting backlash at the time, but nevertheless called it an "extraordinary experience and opportunity" and "an incredible honor". The following year, Dern co-starred in the television film The Baby Dance, for which she received a Golden Globe Award nomination for Best Actress – Miniseries or Television Film. While dating Billy Bob Thornton in 1999, she was cast as his love interest in his film Daddy and Them, which also includes Diane Ladd. Dern appeared in Joe Johnston's biographical drama film October Sky alongside Jake Gyllenhaal portraying his character's teacher Miss Riley.

2000–2011: Further film and television career

In 2000, Robert Altman cast Dern in his comedy Dr. T & the Women. In 2001, Dern reprised her role as Dr. Ellie Sattler in Jurassic Park III, which was directed by Joe Johnston whom she had worked with in October Sky. Originally hesitant to return for a cameo, Dern was convinced when it was suggested by executive producer Steven Spielberg to the writers, Alexander Payne and Jim Taylor who had previously collaborated with Dern for Citizen Ruth, to have the character play an important role by saving the other characters. That same year, she co-starred in Within These Walls and Arthur Miller's Focus. She starred in the film I Am Sam as Randy Carpenter, a woman running a foster home. In 2002, she starred in the film Damaged Care. In 2004, she starred in the film We Don't Live Here Anymore. Dern starred in the 2005 film Happy Endings, and in the same year, she appeared in the film The Prize Winner of Defiance, Ohio.

In 2006, Dern reunited with director David Lynch for the third time after Blue Velvet and Wild At Heart in the experimental film Inland Empire which was largely shot on a hand-held Sony DSR-PD150 by Lynch himself and without a complete screenplay. Dern portrays an actress, Nikki Grace, who starts to take on the personality of the character she plays. The film debuted at the Venice Film Festival to polarized reviews, the majority being positive, where Dern admitted that she was not sure what the film was about, but has said she would sign up for any project with Lynch. In the same year, Dern portrayed a supporting role in Lonely Hearts. Mike White, known for writing School of Rock and The Good Girl, hired Dern for his directorial debut in 2007, the comedy titled Year of the Dog, and starring Molly Shannon, John C. Reilly and Peter Sarsgaard. In 2008, Dern starred as Florida Secretary of State Katherine Harris in Recount, for which she won the Golden Globe Award for Best Supporting Actress – Series, Miniseries or Television Film. The following year, Dern appeared in the independent drama Tenderness, and in 2010, she appeared in Little Fockers, portraying Prudence, an elementary school principal.

In November 2010, Dern and her parents Diane Ladd and Bruce Dern were presented with stars on the Hollywood Walk of Fame, becoming the first family to do so. In October 2011, she starred in a new HBO comedy-drama television series titled Enlightened in which she also served as co-creator and executive producer. Dern played Amy Jellicoe, a "health and beauty executive who returns from a post-meltdown retreat to pick up the pieces of her broken life." Dern brought screenwriter Mike White, whom she collaborated with on Year of the Dog, back into television work after he had suffered an on-the-job meltdown of his own. The series received critical acclaim and lasted two seasons. Dern's mother Diane Ladd plays the major supporting role of Helen Jellicoe, Dern's character's mother in the series. Dern received her third Golden Globe Award and fifth nomination, her first in the Best Actress in a Television Series – Musical or Comedy category for her performance. She was also nominated for her fifth Primetime Emmy Award, her first in the Outstanding Lead Actress in a Comedy Series category.

2012–present: Recent career and acclaim
In 2012, Dern starred in Paul Thomas Anderson's psychological drama film The Master. In 2014, she co-starred alongside Reese Witherspoon in Jean-Marc Vallée's biographical drama film Wild portraying the character of Bobbi, mother of Cheryl Strayed in flashback scenes, for which she received her second Academy Award nomination and her first in the Best Supporting Actress category. That same year, she portrayed Frannie Lancaster in the coming-of-age romance film The Fault In Our Stars and she portrays Beverly Ladouceur in the sports drama film When the Game Stands Tall produced by Mandalay Pictures. She portrayed Lynn Nash, a widowed mother and grandmother who gets evicted with her family, in 2014's 99 Homes alongside Andrew Garfield.

In 2017, Dern reteamed with both Witherspoon and Vallée from Wild and The Fault In Our Stars co-star Shailene Woodley for the 2017 HBO miniseries Big Little Lies, the latter who Dern had helped convince to join the cast. For her portrayal as Renata Klein in the series, Dern won her first Primetime Emmy Award for Outstanding Supporting Actress in a Limited Series or Movie and her fourth Golden Globe Award for Best Supporting Actress – Series, Miniseries, or Motion Picture Made for Television. That same year, she collaborated for the fourth time with David Lynch, appearing as Diane Evans in the third season of the mystery serial drama television series Twin Peaks and joined the Star Wars franchise portraying Vice-Admiral Amilyn Holdo in Rian Johnson's space opera film Star Wars: The Last Jedi.

In 2018, Dern starred as professor and documentary filmmaker Jennifer Fox, recalling her traumatic past in the autobiographical feature film The Tale, written and directed by Fox. The film premiered at the 2018 Sundance Film Festival on January 20, 2018 to a standing ovation, and later on HBO on May 26, 2018. Dern received her seventh Primetime Emmy nomination for the role in the category Outstanding Lead Actress In A Limited Series Or Movie. That same year, she starred in two biographical drama films, Trial By Fire and JT LeRoy as the author Laura Albert.

In 2019, Dern reprised her role of Renata Klein in Big Little Lies after the series was renewed for a second season where she once again received critical acclaim and received her eighth Primetime Emmy Award nomination, her first in the Outstanding Supporting Actress in a Drama Series category. In the same year, Dern starred in two films nominated for Best Picture at the Academy Awards. The first is Noah Baumbach's Marriage Story, portraying the character Nora Fanshaw, a divorce lawyer which was written by Baumbach with Dern in mind for the role. For her performance, Dern received major awards including earning her first Academy Award for Best Supporting Actress from three nominations, winning the first and only Oscar in an acting category for Netflix, and also received the BAFTA Award for Best Actress in a Supporting Role, the SAG Award for Performance by a Female Actor in a Supporting Role, and the Golden Globe Award for Best Supporting Actress – Motion Picture. The second is Greta Gerwig's film adaptation of Little Women, where she portrayed Marmee March. In 2020, she served as an executive producer on the animated short film If Anything Happens I Love You which was released on Netflix and was a producer on the documentary film The Way I See It.

In 2022, Dern reprised her role as Dr. Ellie Sattler in Jurassic World Dominion. Due to the character's fan influence, Dern and director Colin Trevorrow felt protective of the character and her legacy, and were in agreement to have the character play a major role. With Neill and Goldblum having led in their own Jurassic Park sequel, Trevorrow wanted Dominion to be Dern's film explaining, "It was important for the plot to be driven by Ellie. She's the only one of those three characters that hasn't had her own movie." She is set to star in Florian Zeller's adaptation of his stage play, The Son. Dern appeared in the music video for Taylor Swift's "Bejeweled" from her tenth studio album Midnights (2022).

Dern will star and serve as executive producer for the science fiction drama film Morning directed by Justin Kurzel. She is set to star in the Netflix film Lonely Planet, and will serve as executive producer and star in the upcoming Apple TV+ comedy series Mrs. American Pie. Dern is set to reunite with Wild author Cheryl Strayed and co-star Reese Witherspoon as executive producers for the upcoming Hulu television series Tiny Beautiful Things based on Strayed's book.

Personal life

Relationships and family

Dern began dating musician Ben Harper after they met at one of his concerts in fall 2000. Harper and Dern married on December 23, 2005, at their home in Los Angeles. They have two children together, son Ellery Walker (born August 21, 2001) and daughter Jaya (born November 2004). Through this marriage, Dern became a stepmother and is close with Harper's children from his first marriage, his son, Charles, and daughter, Harris. The two finalised their divorce in 2013.

On October 18, 2017, in the wake of the Harvey Weinstein sexual abuse scandal, Dern appeared on The Ellen DeGeneres Show and revealed that she had been sexually assaulted at age 14.

Political views and activism
During the 66th Golden Globe Awards, on January 11, 2009, Dern expressed support for the incoming administration of Barack Obama during her acceptance speech for her Best Supporting Actress – Series, Miniseries or Television Film win, stating: "I will cherish this as a reminder of the extraordinary, incredible outpouring of people who demanded their voice be heard in this last election so we can look forward to amazing change in this country. Thank you so much!"

An activist and supporter of various charities, Dern advocated Down syndrome awareness in a cover story for Ability Magazine. In 2018, Dern brought activist Mónica Ramírez to the 75th Golden Globe Awards as a guest. In the same year, she attended a Families Belong Together event and expressed her support for immigrants' rights. She is also an advocate for women's rights, gender pay parity, as well as combating gun violence and climate change. In 2019, she became a board member of the Academy Museum of Motion Pictures. Dern is an ambassador for the American Lung Association and serves as an Advisor to the group's National Board of Directors.

Filmography

Film

Television

Video games

Music videos

Awards and nominations

References

External links

 

1967 births
Living people
20th-century American actresses
21st-century American actresses
Actresses from Los Angeles
American people of Norwegian descent
American people of German descent
American child actresses
American film actresses
American television actresses
American voice actresses
Audiobook narrators
Best Miniseries or Television Movie Actress Golden Globe winners
Best Musical or Comedy Actress Golden Globe (television) winners
Best Supporting Actress Academy Award winners
Best Supporting Actress BAFTA Award winners
Best Supporting Actress Golden Globe (film) winners
Best Supporting Actress Golden Globe (television) winners
Dern family
Lee Strasberg Theatre and Film Institute alumni
American LGBT rights activists
Outstanding Performance by a Female Actor in a Supporting Role Screen Actors Guild Award winners
Outstanding Performance by a Supporting Actress in a Miniseries or Movie Primetime Emmy Award winners